The Ricalde Stadium is a football stadium and venue located in Corozal Town, Belize and can hold up to 1,000 spectators.

Its dominant use is for football games, but occasionally hosts other miscellaneous events, such as the Band Fest 2014 moved from the Orange Walk People's Stadium to be scheduled at this venue.

Facilities

Apparently, this ground lacks many elements of a stadium- there are no concession or refreshment stands, touchlines or team stores but there are floodlights and bleachers.

References

Event venues with year of establishment missing
Football venues in Belize